Robbers' Roost is a 1955 American Western film directed by Sidney Salkow and written by John O'Dea, Sidney Salkow and Maurice Geraghty. The film stars George Montgomery, Richard Boone, Sylvia Findley, Bruce Bennett, Peter Graves and Tony Romano. It is based on the novel Robbers' Roost by Zane Grey. The film was released on May 30, 1955, by United Artists.

A previous adaptation of the story, also titled Robbers' Roost, was released by Fox in 1932 with George O'Brien and Maureen O'Sullivan.

Plot
Suspecting them of being rustlers, cattle rancher Bull Herrick hires two feuding men, Hays and Heesman, as ranch hands to keep a close eye on both. The rancher's sister Helen arrives and wants Bull to return East with her, where doctors can treat the condition that has left him in a wheelchair.

A stranger in town, calling himself Tex, has joined up with the Hays group of ranch hands. Tex soon earns Bulls trust and is asked to protect Helen from unwanted suitors. Hays and Heesman join forces to gradually steal the cattle small amounts at a time. When Helen goes into town to find a buyer for the cattle, she spots a wanted poster at the train station showing Tex's true identity to be Jim Wall, a fugitive from a murder charge.

Hays double crosses Heesman, stealing the rest of the herd, and kidnaps Helen. Both Heesman's gang and the sheriff's posse start off in pursuit. Tex helps Helen escape, knocking her unconscious after she refuses to leave with him. On the run from Hays, she learns Tex had shot two men when Hays and his men stole his horses and killed his wife. Helen creates a rockslide, trapping Hays. A dying Hays confesses to the sheriff, clearing Tex of the murder charges.

Cast 
George Montgomery as Jim 'Tex' Wall
Richard Boone as Hank Hays
Sylvia Findley as Helen Herrick
Bruce Bennett as 'Bull' Herrick
Peter Graves as Heesman
Tony Romano as Happy Jack
Warren Stevens as Smokey
William Hopper as Robert Bell
Stanley Clements as Chuck
Leo Gordon as Jeff

References

External links 
 

1955 films
1950s English-language films
United Artists films
American Western (genre) films
1955 Western (genre) films
Films directed by Sidney Salkow
Films based on works by Zane Grey
1950s American films